The Lafayette Pavilion Apartments is the name of a high-rise residential apartment building in Detroit, Michigan. It is located at 1 Lafayette Plaisance, near Gratiot Avenue and I-375, near Chene Park.

Construction began in 1955 and was completed in 1958. The building, whose exterior was constructed primarily of aluminum and glass,  is 22 floors in height, and was designed in the international architectural style.

The Lafayette Pavilion Apartments are one of four towers in the Lafayette Park development. The other three are the Windsor Tower, and the Lafayette Towers Apartments.

Along with the other neighboring Ludwig Mies van der Rohe-designed buildings, this building was added to the National Register of Historic Places in 1996.

External links
 Google Maps location of the Lafayette Pavilion Apartments
 Lafayette Pavilion Apartments details at Emporis.com
 SkyscraperPage.com's Profile on the Lafayette Pavilion Apartments

Apartment buildings in Detroit
Ludwig Mies van der Rohe buildings
Residential skyscrapers in Detroit
Residential buildings completed in 1958
1950s architecture in the United States
International style architecture in Michigan
Modernist architecture in Michigan